Fairhill Road Village (called locally "Belgian Village") is a small housing development on the border of Cleveland and Cleveland Heights, Ohio.

As Fairhill Road Village  Historic District it was listed on the National Register of Historic Places in 1990.

The village is a small planned community, a collection of five pairs of semi-detached buildings and three separate dwellings, designed in English Cotswold style.

It was designed by landscape architect A. Donald Gray with architects Antonio DiNardo and H. O. Fullerton.

It includes 12 contributing buildings and Tudor Revival architecture.

References

Buildings and structures completed in 1929
Historic districts on the National Register of Historic Places in Ohio
National Register of Historic Places in Cleveland, Ohio
National Register of Historic Places in Cuyahoga County, Ohio
Tudor Revival architecture in the United States